Mariá Álvarez Rios (June 5, 1919 – December 6, 2010) was a Cuban composer, pianist and educator.

She was born in Tuinicú and studied music from a young age. She continued her studies at the University of Havana and the University of Michigan where she earned a doctorate in music. She wrote music to poems by Nicolás Guillén, José Martí, Félix Pita Rodríguez and Gabriela Mistral, and also wrote music for the stage; she was known for her contributions to children's music.

Selected works 
 Abrazame amor, song
 Anda di, corazo'n, song
 Ya no me llamas, song
 La rosa y el ruiseñor, song
 Como se duele, song

References 

1919 births
2010 deaths
Cuban composers
University of Michigan School of Music, Theatre & Dance alumni
University of Havana alumni
Cuban expatriates in the United States